Iqbaljit Singh Grewal (born 4 November 1959) is an Indian field hockey player. He competed in the men's tournament at the 1984 Summer Olympics.

References

External links
 

1959 births
Living people
Indian male field hockey players
Olympic field hockey players of India
Field hockey players at the 1984 Summer Olympics
Place of birth missing (living people)